Route 195 is a state highway in northeastern Connecticut, running from the Willimantic section of Windham to the town center of Tolland via the Storrs section of Mansfield. The road is the main thoroughfare to access the main campus of the University of Connecticut.

Route description

Route 195 begins as Ash Street and Jackson Street at an intersection with Route 66 in the Willimantic section of Windham. It heads north, crossing into Mansfield, where it becomes Storrs Road and continues past the Natchaug River. It soon  has an interchange with US 6  before turning northwest at the Willimantic Reservoir. Route 195 then enters the Storrs section of Mansfield, passing the eastern end of Route 275 before entering the University of Connecticut campus. North of campus at the Mansfield Four Corners intersection, it intersects US 44, then meets the southern end of Route 320 and intersects Route 32 before continuing across the Willimantic River into the town of Coventry, where it is known as Tolland Turnpike. Route 195 cuts across the northeast corner of Coventry into Tolland, where it becomes Merrow Road and continues northwest, intersecting I-84 at Exit 68 before ending at an intersection with Route 74.

The section of Route 195 from the Windham-Mansfield town line to I-84 in Tolland is designated UConn Husky Way.

History

Route 195 follows the route of the Windham and Mansfield Turnpike, a stage road active from 1800 to after 1828. The turnpike route between Mansfield Center and Storrs was designated as part of State Highway 146 in 1922, running from Willimantic to Mansfield Center via modern Route 89, then to US 44 in Storrs via modern Route 195. Route 195 was established in the 1932 state highway renumbering from most of old Highway 146 between Mansfield Center and Storrs. In 1963, it was extended to the current northern terminus along a new road (the southern part of old Tolland and Mansfield Turnpike). In 1964, part of Route 89 was transferred to Route 195, resulting in Route 195's current route.

Junction list

References

External links

195
Transportation in Tolland County, Connecticut
Transportation in Windham County, Connecticut
Transportation in Windham, Connecticut